is a Japanese actor, voice actor and narrator from Tokyo. He is attached to Theatre Company Subaru. He is best known for Keiichi Nakagawa from Kochira Katsushika-ku Kameari Kōen-mae Hashutsujo, Roger Smith from The Big O, Ougai Mori from Bungo Stray Dogs, Gaku Yashiro from Erased, Steven A. Starphase from Blood Blockade Battlefront and Maiza Avaro from Baccano!, as well as the Japanese voice of adult Simba from The Lion King. In the live action field, Miyamoto is the famous dubbing over artist of Ethan Hawke, Adrien Brody, Matthew Modine, Gil Bellows and Guy Pearce. He was also the first dub-over artist of Keanu Reeves and Brad Pitt in their early days.

Filmography

Television animation
1990s
YuYu Hakusho (1993) (Akarenja)
H2 (1995) (Hideo Tachibana)
Baby and Me (1996) (Harumi Enoki)
Kochira Katsushika-ku Kameari Kōen-mae Hashutsujo (1996) (Keiichi Nakagawa)
Kinda'ichi Case Files (1997) (Takuya Ogi)
Fancy Lala (1998) (Katsunoshin Asaka-sensei)
Super Doll★Licca-chan (1998) (Louie Akiyama)
The Big O (1999) (Roger Smith)
2000s
Fruits Basket (2001) (Ayame Sohma) (snake zodiac)
Piano: The Melody of a Young Girl's Heart (2002) (Shirakawa)
RahXephon (2002) (Itsuki Kisaragi)
Inuyasha (2002) (Lord Kuranosuke Takeda)
Full Metal Panic? Fumoffu (2003) (Mr. Mizuhoshi)
Gunslinger Girl (2003) (Jean)
Wolf's Rain (2003) (Hubb Lebowski)
Naruto (2005) (Akahoshi)
Tsubasa: Reservoir Chronicle (2005) (Kyle Rondart)
Air Gear (2006) (Sora Takeuchi)
Baccano (2007) (Maiza Avaro)
Blue Dragon (2007) (Conrad)
Claymore (2007) (Pablo Mountain Male Awakened Being)
Wangan Midnight (2008) (Eiji Kamiya)
Shikabane Hime: Aka (2008) (Akasha Shishidou)
Shikabane Hime: Kuro (2009) (Akasha Shishidou)
2010s
Katanagatari (2010) (Ginkaku Uneri)
Metal Fight Beyblade: Baku (2010) (Dr. Ziggurat)
Fractale (2011) (Barrot)
Tiger & Bunny (2011) (Dr. Rotwang)
Dragon Crisis! (2012) (George Evans)
Space Battleship Yamato 2199 (2013) (Mamoru Kodai)
Wake Up, Girls! (2014) (Tōru Shiraki)
Yu-Gi-Oh! Zexal II (2014) (Don Thousand - second form)
Mushi-Shi -Next Passage- (2014) (Masaki (Ep. 6))
Tokyo ESP (2014) (Kiriya Konparu)
Nanatsu no Taizai (2014) (Dale)
Akatsuki no Yona (2014) (Ao)
Blood Blockade Battlefront (2015) (Steven A. Starphase)
Erased (2016) (Gaku Yashiro)
Drifters (2016) (Murasaki)
Joker Game (2016) (Aaron Price)
Bungo Stray Dogs (2016) (Ōgai Mori)
Fate/Apocrypha (2017) (Caster of Black/Avicebron)
After the Rain (2018) (Chihiro Kujo)
Beyblade Burst Super Z (2018) (Taiga Akaba)
A Certain Magical Index III (2019) (Aiwass)
2020s
The Misfit of Demon King Academy (2020) (Diego Kanon Ijaysica)
Bungo Stray Dogs! Wan (2021) (Ōgai Mori)
The Idaten Deities Know Only Peace (2021) (Takeshita)
Fanfare of Adolescence (2022) (Futoshi Kashino)
Classroom of the Elite 2nd Season (2022) (Chairman Sakayanagi)
To Your Eternity 2nd Season (2022) (Cylira)

Films
Ghost in the Shell (1995) (Mizuho Daida)
One Piece The Movie: Dead End Adventure (2003) (Shuraiya Bascúd)
Welcome to the Space Show (2010) (Robby)
Saint Seiya: Legend of Sanctuary (2014) (Mu)
Fireworks, Should We See It from the Side or the Bottom? (2017)
Seven Days War (2019) (Kaori Yamazaki's father)

Video games
Everybody's Golf 2 (xxxx) (Hawk)
Double Switch (Eddie) (Japanese dub)
Heavy Rain (2010) (Ethan Mars)
Resident Evil: Revelations (2012) (Parker Luciani)
GioGio's Bizarre Adventure (2002) (Diavolo and Vinegar Doppio)
Super Robot Wars series (xxxx) (Roger Smith)
Tales of Zestiria (xxxx) (Rosh)
Civilization VI (xxxx) (Philip II)
Kingdom Hearts II (2005) (Simba)
Fate/Grand Order (2018) (Avicebron)
Marvel's Spider-Man (2018) (Mr. Negative/Martin Li)
Disney: Twisted-Wonderland (2020) (Dire Crowley)
Tactics Ogre: Reborn (2022) (Nybeth Obdilord)

Drama CDs
Soul Eater (xxxx) (Franken Stein)

Tokusatsu
Kaitou Sentai Lupinranger VS Keisatsu Sentai Patranger (2018) (Dogranio Yaboon (eps. 1 - 4, 6 - 7, 10 - 11, 13 - 15, 18, 20 - 23,  25 - 26, 28 - 30, 32, 34 - 36, 38, 40 - 43, 46 - 51))
Kaitou Sentai Lupinranger VS Keisatsu Sentai Patranger en Film  (2018) (Dogranio Yaboon)

Dubbing

Live-action
Ethan Hawke
Alive (Nando Parrado)
Before Sunrise (Jesse Wallace)
Gattaca (Vincent Anton Freeman)
Snow Falling on Cedars (Ishmael Chambers)
Hamlet (Hamlet)
Before Sunset (Jesse Wallace)
Taking Lives (2008 TV Asahi edition) (James Costa)
Assault on Precinct 13  (2008 TV Asahi edition) (Sergeant Jake Roenick)
Daybreakers (Edward Dalton)
Before Midnight (Jesse)
Getaway (Brent Magna)
Boyhood (Mason Evans Sr.)
The Magnificent Seven (Goodnight Robicheaux)
Adrien Brody
Love the Hard Way (Jack)
The Pianist (Wladyslaw Szpilman)
The Village (Noah Percy)
The Jacket (Jack Starks)
King Kong (Jack Driscoll)
Cadillac Records (Leonard Chess)
The Experiment (Travis)
Third Person (Scott)
Backtrack (Peter Bower)
Dragon Blade (Tiberius)
Manhattan Night (Porter Wren)
Bullet Head (Stacy)
Chapelwaite (Captain Charles Boone)
Keanu Reeves
My Own Private Idaho (Scott Favor)
Point Break (1993 NTV edition) (FBI Agent Johnny Utah)
Bram Stoker's Dracula (1995 TV Asahi edition) (Jonathan Harker)
Speed (1998 TV Asahi edition) (Officer Jack Traven)
Johnny Mnemonic (Johnny Mnemonic)
Feeling Minnesota (Jjaks Clayton)
Chain Reaction (Eddie Kasalivich)
The Matrix (Broadcasting inflight edition) (Thomas Anderson/Neo)
David Arquette
Scream (1996) (Dewey Riley)
Scream 2 (Dewey Riley)
Scream 3 (Dewey Riley)
Never Die Alone (Paul)
The Adventures of Sharkboy and Lavagirl in 3-D (Max's Father)
Scream 4 (Dewey Riley)
Scream (2022) (Dewey Riley)
Brad Pitt
Interview with the Vampire (1998 Fuji TV edition) (Louis de Pointe du Lac)
Legends of the Fall (Tristan Ludlow)
12 Monkeys (Jeffrey Goines)
The Devil's Own (Rory Devaney/Francis "Frankie" McGuire)
The Dark Side of the Sun (Rick)
Meet Joe Black (Joe Black/Man in the Coffee Shop)
Matthew Modine
Pacific Heights (1997 Fuji TV edition) (Drake Goodman)
Cutthroat Island (1998 Fuji TV edition) (William Shaw)
Any Given Sunday (2002 NTV edition) (Dr. Oliver "Ollie" Powers)
Transporter 2 (Jefferson Billings)
Backtrace (MacDonald)
Sicario: Day of the Soldado (James Riley)
Takeshi Kaneshiro
Executioners (Chong Hon / Coda)
Downtown Torpedoes (Jackal)
Hero (Ma Wing-jing)
Tempting Heart (Ho-jun)
Lavender (Angel)
Confession of Pain (Yau Kin-bong)
Guy Pearce
L.A. Confidential (Det. Lt. Edmund "Ed" Exley)
The King's Speech (King Edward VIII)
Lawless (Charlie Rakes)
Mary Queen of Scots (William Cecil)
Bloodshot (Dr. Emil Harting)
Without Remorse (Thomas Clay)
Luke Wilson
Blue Streak (Carlson)
Around the World in 80 Days (2008 TV Tokyo edition) (Orville Wright)
Vacancy (David Fox)
Henry Poole Is Here (Henry Poole)
All We Had (Lee)
Chris O'Donnell
The Three Musketeers (D'Artagnan)
Batman Forever (Dick Grayson/Robin)
Batman & Robin (Dick Grayson/Robin)
Kinsey (Wardell Pomeroy)
Dermot Mulroney
The Heart of Justice (Elliot Burgess)
Point of No Return (1997 NTV edition) (J.P.)
Bad Girls (1997 TV Asahi edition) (Josh McCoy)
My Best Friend's Wedding (Michael O'Neal)
Matt Damon
Courage Under Fire (2004 TV Asahi edition) (Specialist Ilario)
Good Will Hunting (Will Hunting)
Rounders (Mike McDermott)
The Good Shepherd (Edward Wilson)
Edward Norton
Everyone Says I Love You (Holden Spence)
Birdman (Mike Shiner)
Collateral Beauty (Collateral Beauty)
Glass Onion: A Knives Out Mystery (Miles Bron)
12 Years a Slave (Ford (Benedict Cumberbatch))
Alien: Covenant (David and Walter (Michael Fassbender))
Along Came Polly (Claude (Hank Azaria))
Amélie (Nino Quincampoix (Mathieu Kassovitz))
Antitrust (Milo Hoffman (Ryan Phillippe))
Apollo 13 (John Aaron (Loren Dean))
August: Osage County (Bill Fordham (Ewan McGregor))
Bandidas (Quentin Cooke (Steve Zahn))
Battlestar Galactica (Dr. Gaius Baltar (James Callis))
Behind Enemy Lines (Lieutenant Chris Burnett (Owen Wilson))
The Big Lebowski (VHS/DVD edition) (Brandt (Philip Seymour Hoffman))
Birthday Girl (John Buckingham (Ben Chaplin))
Blood & Treasure (Simon Hardwick (James Callis))
Blood In Blood Out (Miklo (Damian Chapa))
The Boondock Saints II: All Saints Day (Murphy McManus (Norman Reedus))
The Bourne Identity (Danny Zorn (Gabriel Mann))
Brain Games (Mark Cuban)
Broken City (Jack Valliant (Barry Pepper))
Can't Hardly Wait (Preston Meyers (Ethan Embry))
Choke (Lord High Charlie (Clark Gregg))
Christine (2019 Blu-Ray edition) (Detective Rudolph "Rudy" Junkins (Harry Dean Stanton))
Clueless (Josh Lucas (Paul Rudd))
The Crow (1997 TV Tokyo edition) (Eric Draven/The Crow (Brandon Lee))
Dead Poets Society (1994 Fuji TV edition) (Neil Perry (Robert Sean Leonard))
Dear John (Tim Wheddon (Henry Thomas))
Desperate Measures (Frank Conner (Andy García))
Down with Love (Catcher Block (Ewan McGregor))
ER (George Henry (Chad Lowe))
Final Destination 2 (2006 TV Tokyo edition) (Thomas Burke (Michael Landes))
First Blood (1995 TV Asahi edition) (Deputy Mitch Rogers (David Caruso))
The Flash (Dr. Harrison Wells (Tom Cavanagh))
Gentlemen Broncos (Dusty (Mike White))
Gladiator (2003 TV Asahi edition) (Commodus (Joaquin Phoenix))
Golden Job (Lion (Ekin Cheng))
The Great Gatsby (Nick Carraway (Sam Waterston))
A Hidden Life (Franz Jägerstätter (August Diehl))
Hocus Pocus (Max (Omri Katz))
Hollywood Homicide (Detective K. C. Calden (Josh Hartnett))
Home Alone (1998 TV Asahi edition) (Marv (Daniel Stern))
Hope Floats (Justin Matisse (Harry Connick Jr.))
The Hudsucker Proxy (Norville Barnes (Tim Robbins))
The Indian in the Cupboard (Little Bear (Litefoot))
Inspector Gadget (Sanford Scolex / Dr. Claw (Rupert Everett))
Kalifornia (Brian Kessler (David Duchovny))
Lara Croft: Tomb Raider (2005 TV Asahi edition) (Bryce (Noah Taylor))
Lara Croft: Tomb Raider – The Cradle of Life (2006 TV Asahi edition) (Bryce (Noah Taylor))
The Legend of Zu (King Sky (Ekin Cheng))
Lincoln (President Abraham Lincoln (Daniel Day-Lewis))
The Lord of the Rings trilogy (Faramir (David Wenham))
The Lord of the Rings: The Rings of Power (Celebrimbor (Charles Edwards))
Love in the Time of Cholera (Florentino Ariza (Javier Bardem))
Mannequin (Jonathan Switcher (Andrew McCarthy))
Martial Arts of Shaolin (Chao Wei)
Moulin Rouge! (Christian (Ewan McGregor))
Much Ado About Nothing (Count Claudio (Robert Sean Leonard))
Music and Lyrics (Alex Fletcher (Hugh Grant))
Nemesis (Billy (Thomas Jane))
The Order (Alex Bernier (Heath Ledger))
Ouija: Origin of Evil (Father Tom Hogan (Henry Thomas))
Pay It Forward (Ricky McKinney (Jon Bon Jovi))
Platoon (1998 DVD edition) (Chris Taylor (Charlie Sheen))
Prometheus (David (Michael Fassbender))
Pulp Fiction (Lance (Eric Stoltz))
Quiz (Charles Ingram (Matthew Macfadyen))
Quiz Show (Charles Van Doren (Ralph Fiennes))
The Reader (Michael Berg (Ralph Fiennes))
Resident Evil (Matt Addison (Eric Mabius))
Scandal (Stephen Finch (Henry Ian Cusick))
Scary Movie (Doofy Gilmore (Dave Sheridan))
Sense and Sensibility (Edward Ferrars (Hugh Grant))
Single White Female (Sam Rawson (Steven Weber))
Sleeping with the Enemy (Fleishman (Kyle Secor))
Sneakers (Carl Arbogast (River Phoenix))
Someone like You (Eddie Alden (Hugh Jackman))
Speed 2: Cruise Control (Merced (Brian McCardie))
Switchback (Dr. Lane Dixon (Jared Leto))
The Terminator (1998 DVD edition) (Kyle Reese (Michael Biehn))
This Boy's Life (Arthur Gayle (Jonah Blechman))
Transformers: Dark of the Moon (President Kennedy)
U.S. Marshals (2004 TV Tokyo edition) (John Royce (Robert Downey Jr.))
The Usual Suspects (Fred Fenster (Benicio del Toro))
Waitress (Dr. Jim Pomatter (Nathan Fillion))
What's Eating Gilbert Grape (Gilbert Grape (Johnny Depp))
Wyatt Earp (Morgan Earp (Linden Ashby))

Animation
The Animatrix (Tom)
The Boss Baby: Back in Business (Bootsy Calico)
A Bug's Life (Flik)
Cars (Flik)
The Lion Guard (Simba)
The Lion King (adult Simba)
Toy Story 2 (Flik)

References

External links
 

1958 births
Living people
Japanese male video game actors
Japanese male voice actors
Male voice actors from Tokyo
20th-century Japanese male actors
21st-century Japanese male actors